Pál Romány (17 November 1929 – 16 December 2019) was a Hungarian agrarian engineer and former Communist politician, who served as Minister of Agriculture and Food between 1975 and 1980. He was the last Rector of Hungarian MSZMPs Political School in 1988–89.

References

Sources
 Bölöny, József – Hubai, László: Magyarország kormányai 1848–2004 [Cabinets of Hungary 1848–2004], Akadémiai Kiadó, Budapest, 2004 (5th edition).

1929 births
2019 deaths
People from Jász-Nagykun-Szolnok County
Members of the Hungarian Socialist Workers' Party
Agriculture ministers of Hungary